Moengo Airstrip , is an airport serving Moengo, Suriname.

Airlines and destinations
Airlines serving this airport are:

See also

 List of airports in Suriname
 Transport in Suriname

References

External links
OurAirports - Moengo
Moengo Airport

Airports in Suriname
Marowijne District